Carrizo Creek Station, a former stage station of the San Antonio-San Diego Mail Line and Butterfield Overland Mail, located in Imperial County, California just east of the San Diego County line. It lies within the boundaries of the Anza-Borrego Desert State Park just west of the Carrizo Impact Area. Its site is located along the bank of Carrizo Creek.

History

Carrizo, the site of the Carrizo Stage Station, lies on the Southern Emigrant Trail where Carrizo Creek flowed at the surface most of the year, and often provided the first flowing water to travelers on that route after they had left the Colorado River. Earlier, Carrizo had been a watering place for the local Native Americans, Spanish explorers, Mexican traders, American fur trappers and soldiers.

Military Storehouse

The 1855 Railroad Survey expedition camped at Carrizo in June and its report described the place:

At Carrizo Creek the mail company used the adobe constructed by the military in June 1855, as a station building. It was described by a correspondent as an old adobe house with the thatch roof burned off, occupied by William Mailland in the fall of 1857.

Stagecoach Station

The station at Carrizo Creek became an important link in the San Antonio-San Diego Mail Line.  It functioned as one of seven major stations west of the Rio Grande River. Passengers at Carrizo Creek disembarked here to change coaches leaving the east-bound stage from San Diego and boarded another that ran between Carrizo and Fort 
Yuma.  The coach remained at the station until the other returned with west-bound passengers that had boarded in Yuma. Watering stations were established at an average of 30 mile intervals 

That first Carrizo station keeper, William Mailland, in a drunken fit brutally killed his Native American wife in May 1858. Fearing revenge by the local natives and arrest by authorities after he sobered up, he was said to have fled into the desert and was believed to have died, while an acquaintance claimed he had been seen east of the Colorado River, fleeing to Sonora.

Under the Butterfield Overland Mail, Carrizo Station, like other stations, functioned as a changing or "swing" station that replaced teams with fresh horses. Carrizo had a single keeper, a hostler, who took care of the livestock and with the driver changed the teams.

After the Butterfield Overland Mail shut down in March 1861, the Union Army used the station as a camp on their road to Fort Yuma and Arizona Territory. It became a stage station again for the Banning and Thomlinson lines from 1867 until 1877 when the railroad arrived in Fort Yuma making the route obsolete.

Modern Discoveries At The Site 
During March and April 2001, a systematic archaeological testing program was implemented at the Carrizo Stage Station site. The initial field test excavations and artifact analysis confirmed the presence of two structures and remains of the 1857 to 1877 Carrizo Stage Station. After excavation it was subsequently reburied and erosion protection features were installed to prevent further damage to the site.

External links
  Carrizo Creek Station on the Butterfield Overland Mail Line, accessed from parks.ca.gov on October 25, 2013 Photo of excavated Carrizo Stage Station site with captions describing its features.

References

Carrizo Creek Stage Station
San Antonio–San Diego Mail Line
Former settlements in Imperial County, California
Former populated places in California
American frontier
Stagecoach stations in California
1855 establishments in California
Transportation buildings and structures in Imperial County, California